László Bognár (born February 24, 1968) is a Hungarian former professional boxer who fought in the featherweight to light welterweight divisions. As an amateur he represented his native country at the 1992 Summer Olympics in Barcelona, Spain.

He is a former WBU International featherweight, WBO Inter-Continental super featherweight, Hungarian and IBC lightweight champion.

Professional career
Bognar turned professional in October 1994 at Szekszárd, Hungary. In his debut he defeated Romanian's Radu Petricon points over six rounds.

Michael Gomez fights
Bognar fought Irish fighter Michael Gomez on his first fight of 2001 on 10 February for the WBO Intercontinental super featherweight title, in Widnes, Cheshire, England. Gomez had Bognar on the canvas in the fifth round after landing a crushing left hook.  Although Bognar was shaken Gomez was unable to make his power count. Bognar recovered from his knockdown and kept Gomez at bay with his southpaw jab.  In the ninth round Gomez was stopped after referee Dave Paris stepped in following a double left from Bognar, which had Gomez stricken against the ropes. Gomez felt the fight had been stopped prematurely and that he should have been allowed to continue.

Gomez later stated that he was suffering from flu and should not have taken the fight.  John Munroe, who was sitting ringside, was called over by Ian Darke, at Gomez's request to verify his theory.  This turned into a war of words, with the promoter Frank Warren and John Munroe regarding Brian Hughes, with Frank Warren promising Gomez the rematch, and Gomez stating that he was leaving Brian Hughes' gym to team up with Billy Graham.  However, others pointed to his well publicised troubles out of the ring. There had been reports in the press that Gomez was not training regularly, that he had not stuck to his diet and had been out drinking and clubbing. Reports also circulated that Gomez was having trouble in his private life and that he had been stabbed in a street fight.

Gomez rematch
Gomez wanted to rematch against Bognar, and five months later and a victory over John Munroe, in July 2001, the pair had a rematch in Manchester in what turned out to be a short and explosive encounter. The fight started badly for Gomez when he suffered a flash knockdown in the first round and was down again in the second.  Gomez came back to put Bognar down near the end of the second round. Gomez came out firing at the start of the third round and finished the fight with a fourth and final knockdown to avenge his earlier defeat.

References

External links
 
 Profile

1968 births
Living people
Boxers at the 1992 Summer Olympics
Olympic boxers of Hungary
Hungarian male boxers
Light-welterweight boxers
People from Szolnok
Sportspeople from Jász-Nagykun-Szolnok County